Thomas or John Carte (1686–1754) was an English historian with Jacobite sympathies, who served as a Church of England clergyman.

Life 

Carte was born in 1686 near Clifton upon Dunsmore (itself near Rugby), the eldest son of the antiquarian Samuel Carte. He matriculated at University College, Oxford in 1698, and took his degree from Brasenose College, Oxford, in 1702, and an MA from King's College, Cambridge, in 1706.

Carte first became known for the controversy that opposed him to Henry Chandler, father of Samuel Chandler, regarding the role played by King Charles I in the Irish Rebellion of 1641. This controversy started with a sermon Carte preached at the Abbey Church in Bath in 1714, where he was a reader. In this sermon Carte defended King Charles I against the accusation that he was in league with Phelim O'Neill who pretended to act on a (probably false) royal commission issued.

His attachment to the Stuarts also caused him to remain a non-juror. He was ordained around 1714, and in that year refused to take the Oath of Allegiance. On the discovery of the plot of Francis Atterbury, whose secretary he was, he was accused of high treason in 1722 and was forced to flee to France adopting the name of Philips.

There he collected materials for illustrating a London edition of the Historium sui temporis of Jacques Auguste de Thou planned by Samuel Buckley. These materials were purchased and published by Richard Mead. Carte was pardoned and recalled to England in 1728 through the influence of Queen Caroline. Carte held the rectory in Yattendon, Berkshire, during the later part of his life.

Richard Mead made it possible for Carte and Samuel Buckley to publish the London edition of de Thou's Latin History in 1733.

He started work on the Life of James Duke of Ormond. He obtained an important collection of letters from Charles Butler, 1st Earl of Arran. He published the letters in 1735 as volume 3 so that references could be made to them with correct page numbers. He then published volumes 1 and 2 in 1736.

He then started work on a "General History of England" as an improvement on Paul de Rapin's Histoire d'Angleterre. Carte published volume 1 in 1747, volume 2 in 1750 an volume 3 in 1752. Volume 4 was published in 1755 after his death. He lost the trust of many of his patrons by including an anecdote about a miraculous healing of King's Evil by royal touch, given by the "Old Pretender" in the first volume.

He died on 2 April 1754. He was buried in the church at Yattendon.

Works

Life of James Duke of Ormond

Edition 1635/1636 

In three volumes:. Volume three was published first and has a different title.

 – Letters

Edition 1851 

In six volumes

 – 1613 to 1641
 – 1641 to 1643
 – 1643 to 1660
 – 1660 to 1688
 – Letters 1
 – Letters 2

A General History of England 

 – Earliest times to 1216
 – 1216 to 1509
 – 1509 to 1613

Other works 

 A General Account of the Necessary Materials for a History of England (1738)
 History of the Revolutions of Portugal, with letters of Sir Robert Southwell during his embassy there (London, 1740)

He collected a large quantity of historical papers during his life. They became the property of the University of Oxford, and were deposited in the Bodleian Library, where they are known as the Carte Manuscripts.

References

Notes

Bibliography 

 – Earliest times to 1216

 – Abbas to Cutts

Further reading 

1686 births
1754 deaths
English Jacobites
Alumni of Brasenose College, Oxford
Alumni of King's College, Cambridge
Alumni of University College, Oxford
18th-century English historians
People from Yattendon